Roccabruna (or) is a commune in the Province of Cuneo and the Italian region of Piedmont, located about  southwest of Turin and about  northwest of Cuneo.

Roccabruna borders the following municipalities: Cartignano, Dronero, Melle, San Damiano Macra, Busca and Villar San Costanzo.

References

External links
 Official website

Cities and towns in Piedmont